HMS Archer was one of 20 Acheron-class destroyers built for the Royal Navy in the 1910s. She was one of the two Yarrow Specials with which the builder was given more freedom in an effort to increase speeds beyond the rest of the class. Completed in 1912 the ship served during the First World War and was sold in 1921.

Design and description
The Acheron class was a repeat of the preceding , although the Admiralty allowed three builders, including Yarrow, more freedom to modify the design of two of their ships apiece in hopes that they might be able to improve upon the speeds previously attained. The ships displaced  at deep load and their crew numbered 70 officers and ratings.

Archer was powered by a single Brown-Curtis steam turbine that drove two propeller shafts using steam provided by three Yarrow boilers.

The primary armament of the ships consisted of a pair of BL  Mk VIII guns in single, unprotected pivot mounts fore and aft of the superstructure. They were also armed with two single QF 12-pounder guns, one on each broadside abreast the bridge. The destroyers were equipped with a pair of single rotating mounts for 21-inch (533 mm) torpedo tubes amidships and carried two reload torpedoes.

Construction and career

Archer, the fourth ship of the name to serve in the Royal Navy, was ordered under the 1910–1911 Naval Programme from Yarrow & Company. She was laid down at the company's shipyard in Scotstoun on 1 September 1910, launched on 21 October 1911 and commissioned in March 1912.

From 1917 the Third Battle Squadron was deployed to the Mediterranean. Archer was present at the entry of the Allied fleet through the Dardanelles on 12 November 1918. She was sold to Thos. W. Ward for scrap on 9 May 1921.

Pennant numbers

References

Bibliography

External links
 

 

Acheron-class destroyers of the Royal Navy
Ships built on the River Clyde
1911 ships
World War I destroyers of the United Kingdom